Hamilton East is a New Zealand parliamentary electorate. It is currently held by Jamie Strange MP of the Labour Party.

Population centres
There were 84 electorates for the 1969 election, and the 1972 electoral redistribution saw three additional general seats created for the North Island, bringing the total number of electorates to 87. Together with increased urbanisation in Christchurch and Nelson, the changes proved very disruptive to existing electorates. In the South Island, three electorates were abolished, and three electorates were newly created. In the North Island, five electorates were abolished, two electorates were recreated, and six electorates were newly created (including Hamilton East).

The earlier Hamilton electorate dates from 1922. In 1969 Hamilton West was split off; that electorate initially extended to the west coast. In 1972 the additional electorate of Hamilton East was created, and Hamilton was abolished.

The electorate is mainly urban, and covers the eastern part of the city of Hamilton. The Waikato River divides the city in half and forms the boundary between the Hamilton East and Hamilton West electorates. Only one other electorate borders Hamilton East, the rural electorate of Waikato to the east.

Hamilton East includes the suburbs of Rototuna, Flagstaff, Queenwood, Chedworth Park, Fairfield, Fairview Downs, Enderley, Claudelands, Hamilton East, Hillcrest, Silverdale and Riverlea.

Hamilton East is home to the University of Waikato, and 11.3% of the electorate's workforce is employed in education and training, the second-highest proportion in the country. The majority of households are families, and the median family income is NZ$61,500, which is $2,500 higher than the national median.

History
Nearly every party since 1972 that has won Hamilton East and its sister seat of Hamilton West has gone on to form the government, earning these seats a reputation as bellwether seats. One notable exception was in 1993, when Labour captured both Hamilton seats from National, but failed to win a parliamentary majority.  In recent years, such as the 1999 and 2005 elections, Hamilton East has been won more often by a National candidate, despite the Labour Party forming the government.

Members of Parliament
Unless otherwise stated, all MPs terms began and ended at general elections.

Key

List MPs
Members of Parliament elected from party lists in elections where that person also unsuccessfully contested the Hamilton East electorate. Unless otherwise stated, all MPs terms began and ended at general elections.

1Resigned March 2008, list seat taken by William Sio

Election results

2020 election

2017 election

2014 election

2011 election

Electorate (as at 26 November 2011): 45,420

2008 election

2005 election

2002 election

a United Future swing compared to results of United NZ and Future NZ, as the two merged in 2000.

1999 election

1996 election

1993 election

1990 election

1987 election

1984 election

1981 election

1978 election

1975 election

1972 election

Footnotes

Notes

References

External links
Electorate Profile, New Zealand Parliament

New Zealand electorates
Politics of Hamilton, New Zealand
1972 establishments in New Zealand